Unión Magdalena commonly known as El Unión, and nicknamed as El Ciclón Bananero (The Banana Cyclone) and also Los Samarios (The Samarios), is a Colombian football club from the city of Santa Marta, capital of the department of Magdalena, founded on April 19 1953. They currently play in the Primera A, first division of the Dimayor.

Founded on 10 March 1951 as Deportivo Samarios, the club was re-founded as Unión Magdalena on 19 April 1953. The original playing squad was largely composed of Hungarians who were touring Colombia when their club, the Hungaria FbC Roma, was disbanded.

History
Unión Magdalena was founded as Deportivo Samarios on 10 March 1951. The team was founded with the help of José Eduardo Gnecco Correa and Eduardo Dávila Riascos and was formed by the squad of the Hungaria FbC Roma when it was disbanded after a tour in South America. The first team consisted in 10 Colombians, 8 Hungarians, 2 Yugoslavs, 1 Austrian, 1 Argentine, 1 Italian and 1 Romanian. Deportivo Samarios debuted on league that same year and placed 14th. That season, the team achieved the record of the biggest win in the Colombian league against Universidad, with a score of 12–1.

The club was re-founded as Unión Magdalena on 19 April 1953. Unión has only won one championship, in 1968 playing against Deportivo Cali in the final, thus becoming the first football club of the Caribbean region of Colombia to win a football championship in history. Carlos Valderrama, born in Santa Marta and one of the most famous Colombian footballer, started his career in this club.

Relegated in 2005 after losing 3–0 to Deportivo Pereira, Unión earned automatic promotion to the 2019 Categoría Primera A season, after playing 13 years in the second division football league. Despite qualifying for the semifinals of the 2019 Apertura, Unión's performance in the Finalización tournament was poor and the club ended up being relegated on 29 October after losing 3–1 to Once Caldas.
 
Red and blue stripes compose the traditional shirt of the team, and its design is inspired by the Argentine club San Lorenzo de Almagro.

2021 controversy and promotion
On 4 December 2021, the last matchday of the semi-final Group B of the second tournament of the 2021 Primera B season, Unión Magdalena sealed their promotion to Categoría Primera A after coming back from a 1–0 deficit against Llaneros in Villavicencio with a couple of goals in quick succession in stoppage time to win the game by a 2–1 score and get promoted at the expense of Fortaleza, who were clinching promotion with the score in Villavicencio despite losing their final match to Bogotá at the same time. However, video footage of Unión Magdalena's winning goal appeared to show the Llaneros players backing off and failing to make an effort to prevent their rivals from scoring. The events sparked outrage both within the country and abroad, with Colombian internationals Juan Cuadrado and Mateus Uribe expressing their displeasure, calling them "a lack of respect" and "an embarrassment for Colombian football", whilst President of Colombia Iván Duque Márquez stated it was a "national disgrace".

In response to the growing backlash, as well as calls from Fortaleza to get the match annulled and Unión Magdalena's promotion reversed, Dimayor chairman Fernando Jaramillo ordered the opening of an inquiry on the match events while also requesting the Office of the Attorney General of Colombia to investigate whether any criminal offenses had been committed, but on 7 December 2021, Jaramillo stated that the tournament would not be paused and Unión Magdalena's promotion would not be overturned while due process was completed. However, amid the ongoing inquiries, the Torneo II's final match between Cortuluá and Unión Magdalena, which was originally scheduled to be played on 11 December 2021 in Tuluá was postponed until further notice.

On 30 December 2021 Dimayor's disciplinary commission closed the investigation on Unión Magdalena as it found no evidence implying that members of the aforementioned club had been responsible for the events that occurred in the match against Llaneros, thus confirming their promotion to Primera A for the 2022 season.

Stadiums
The Eduardo Santos Stadium, inaugurated in 1951, was the highest sports venue for Magdalenes, located in the Olympic Village of Santa Marta. It served for the Unión Magdalena local games but since its inauguration, it has not only been the headquarters of the Unión Magdalena soccer club, it also witnessed the birth of prominent Colombian soccer figures such as the former Colombian team captain, Carlos "El Pibe" Valderrama. It currently has a capacity of 23,000 spectators.

On 3 March 2013, Unión Magdalena played its last game at the stadium against Llaneros F.C., in compliance with the final closure order of the Eduardo Santos Stadium.

The team had a tour of venues around Riohacha (La Guajira) at the Federico Serrano Soto Stadium and then in the Magdalena municipality of Ciénaga, at the "Luis Tete Samper" Municipal Stadium, with a capacity of 5,000 spectators.

After the inauguration of the Sierra Nevada Stadium for the 2017 Bolivarian Games, the Union Magdalena made the agreement with the mayor of Santa Marta official to return to the city from the 2018 season.

Players

Current squad

Players with dual citizenship
   Carlos Bejarano

First Team (Deportivo Samarios – 1951)

Honours

Domestic

Campeonato Profesional/Categoría Primera A:
Winners (1): 1968

Categoría Primera B:
Winners (1): 2021–II
Runners-up (2): 2000, 2018

Copa Colombia:
Runners-up (1): 1989

Performance in CONMEBOL competitions

Notable players

 Gyula Zsengellér (1951–53)
 Georg Hanke (1951)
 György Marik (1951–1952)
 Gabriel Rakosky (1952)
 Kalman Lami (1952)
 Ladislao Magyar (1952)
 Nicolás Hrotko (1952)
 Bruno Gerzelli (1952)
 Corrado Contin (1952)
 Manuel Rossi (1965)
 Arístides Del Puerto (1973)
 Luis Giribet (1976)
 Víctor Solar (1977)
 Carlos Valderrama (1981–84)
 Alfredo Arango (1965–1972) (1973–1974) (1978–1980)
 Carlos Arango (1950) (1960–1961)
 Aurelio Palacios
 Nixon Perea (1993)
 Erwin Carrillo (2004–2005) (2007–2009) (2012–2014) (2018)
 Abel Aguilar (2018–2020)
 David Ferreira (2018–2019)

Personnel

Current technical staff

References

External links

Football clubs in Colombia
Association football clubs established in 1950
Santa Marta
1950 establishments in Colombia
Categoría Primera A clubs
Categoría Primera B clubs